The  was a former Japanese government ministry. Its headquarters were in Kasumigaseki, Chiyoda, Tokyo.

The Ministry of Education was created in 1871. It merged with the  into the new Ministry of Education, Culture, Sports, Science and Technology (MEXT) on January 6, 2001.

References

External links
 
  

 
E
Education ministries
Science and technology ministries
Culture ministries
Ministries disestablished in 2001
2001 disestablishments in Japan